The Network for Reporting on Eastern Europe (n-ost) is an international non-governmental organization and a registered association based in Berlin. Also known by the acronym n-ost, the Network for Reporting on Eastern Europe is led by Executive Director Hanno Gundert and a seven-member board. The organisation has its main office with full-time staff in Berlin's Kreuzberg district.

Overview
n-ost aims to improve journalists’ reporting on Eastern Europe. It also aims to make a contribution to the development of democratic media in Eastern Europe and to the establishment of a pan-European public sphere. To this end it provides newspapers and radio stations in Germany, Austria and Switzerland with daily background reports from Eastern Europe, organizes training programmes for journalists and hosts a large annual media conference at a different venue each year – in recent years the conference has taken place in Berlin, Prague, Sofia, Bucharest, Rostov on Don, Pécs and Minsk. A joint program of n-ost and Access Info Europe is Legal Leaks, which tries to empower journalists to use better their right of access to information Freedom of information legislation. In addition n-ost organizes various projects for journalists – for example a research grant programme for investigation of right-wing extremism and antisemitism in Eastern Europe, a reportage prize, a European online culture portal and a series of reports focusing on particular topics, such as poverty among old people in Eastern Europe or globalisation and the labour market. Almost 250 German-speaking journalists from twenty countries are members of n-ost. Since May 2008 n-ost has been producing eurotopics.net – a quadri-lingual European online debate portal – on behalf of the Bundeszentrale für politische Bildung (Federal Agency for Civic Education) – for which it has a separate team of editorial staff.

n-ost’s work is supported by an advisory board comprising the following members: Werner D'Inka (publisher of the Frankfurter Allgemeine Zeitung), Sabine Adler (head of Deutschlandradio-Hauptstadtstudio), Christian Böhme (chief editor of the Jüdische Allgemeine Zeitung), Henrik Kaufholz (duty editor at Politiken, Copenhagen), Horst Pöttker (Professor of Journalism at the Technical University Dortmund), Sonja Margolina (journalist), Uwe Neumärker (director of the foundation "Memorial to the Murdered Jews of Europe"), Tomasz Dąbrowski (director of the Polish Institute in Berlin), Ludmila Rakusanova (head of the VLP Institute for Regional Journalism, Prague), Markus Hipp (Executive Director BMW Foundation Herbert Quandt) and Uwe Leuschner (entrepreneur).

n-ost works closely with other journalists' organisations and networks pursuing similar aims, both in Germany and at an international level. These include the journalists’ organisation Netzwerk Recherche, the Polish foundation Medientandem and the Hungarian Bálint György Academy of Journalism. n-ost also stages joint projects with a number of foundations and institutions, including the foundation "Memory, Responsibility and Future", the Friedrich-Ebert-Stiftung, the Robert Bosch Stiftung, Organization for Security and Co-operation in Europe, the Institute for Foreign Relations, the BMW Foundation Herbert Quandt, the German-Czech Future Fund, the Alfred Toepfer Foundation F.V.S., the Konrad Adenauer Stiftung, the Friedrich Naumann Stiftung for Freedom, Renovabis, the Allianz Cultural Foundation and the Goethe Institute.

External links 
 n-ost
 legalleaks.info
 interview with the ex-managing director of n-ost
 Interview with Hanno Gundert, managing director of n-ost
 The Hamburg Signal on Freedom of the Press and Freedom of Thought in Eastern Europe
 Article on N-ost in Hidden Europe
 Article on n-ost in the magazine Europa
 eurotopics.net

Eastern Europe
Non-profit organisations based in Berlin
German journalism organisations